Cockatoo Island is a UNESCO World Heritage Site at the junction of the Parramatta and Lane Cove River in Sydney Harbour, New South Wales, Australia.

Cockatoo Island is the largest of several islands that were originally heavily timbered sandstone knolls. Called Wa-rea-mah by the Indigenous Australians who traditionally inhabited the land prior to European settlement, the island may have been used as a fishing base, although physical evidence of Aboriginal heritage has not been found on the island.

Between 1839 and 1869, Cockatoo Island operated as a convict penal establishment, primarily as a place of secondary punishment for convicts who had re-offended in the colonies.

Cockatoo Island was also the site of one of Australia's biggest shipyards, operating between 1857 and 1991. The first of its two dry docks was built by convicts. Listed on the National Heritage List, the island is significant for its demonstration of the characteristics of a long-running dockyard and shipbuilding complex, including evidence of key functions, structures and operational layout. Cockatoo Island contains the nation's most extensive and varied record of shipbuilding, and has the potential to enhance understanding of maritime and heavy industrial processes in Australia from the mid-19th century.

In July 2010, UNESCO proclaimed Cockatoo Island as a World Heritage Site, and has been managed by the Sydney Harbour Federation Trust since 2001.

Recent use and activities 
The island is managed by the Sydney Harbour Federation Trust which is also responsible for seven other lands around Sydney Harbour. The Harbour Trust is revitalising the island as a landmark harbour attraction with cultural events and heritage interpretation. Today Cockatoo Island retains some remnants of its past. Its prison buildings have been World Heritage listed, part of a serial listing of 11 Australian Convict Sites.

Although some large workshops, slipways, wharves, residences and other buildings remain, major buildings were demolished after Cockatoo Island closed as a dockyard in 1991; pictured right. As the remaining buildings contain few of their original industrial artefacts and none of the remaining industrial heritage including the docks, caissons and cranes is operational, it is difficult to currently see how the island functioned as a dockyard for over a century.

In late March 2005 the Harbour Trust, in partnership with an event organiser, held the Cockatoo Island Festival. The event put the island on Sydney's cultural map and initiated a range of cultural activities including contemporary art installations, exhibitions and festivals.

The Harbour Trust opened a camp and glampsite on the island in 2008. The camp ground attracts some 20,000 campers a year and is a popular spot for watching Sydney's renowned New Year's Eve fireworks. In 2010, the island attracted a capacity crowd of over 2000 campers to view NYE fireworks. Other island holiday accommodation consists of five renovated houses and apartments with harbour and city views.

Sydney Ferries services Cockatoo Island as part of its Woolwich/Balmain ferry route and Parramatta RiverCat route. Day visitors are welcome, and can picnic, barbecue, visit the cafe, wander at leisure or take an audio or guided tour. Cockatoo Island is open daily and there is no admission charge.

Regular events and art installations are a feature of the island.

Cockatoo Island has grown into a versatile cultural venue on Sydney's cultural calendar. In 2008, it was a major venue partner of the 16th Biennale of Sydney, attracting over 80,000 visitors over 12 weeks. In 2010, the event attracted over 156,000 people. In 2009, Cockatoo Island hosted the Sydney Festival's "All Tomorrow's Parties" music festival. The two-day festival included twenty-four bands over four stages across the island, and was curated and headlined by Nick Cave, attracting an audience of over 11,000. The island hosted the World's Funniest Island Comedy Festival in October 2009, with 200 comedy acts appearing over a weekend, attracting over 8,000 visitors.

The island is also increasingly used as a venue for private events both large and small. Part of films Unbroken (film) and the blockbuster X-Men Origins: Wolverine were filmed there in 2008. Reality television programs have also used the island as a location.

Cockatoo Island is the site of an artistic piece which resembles the shadow of Captain Cook's commemorative statue in Sydney. This piece named 'Shadow on the Land, an excavation' pictures a dug out outline of the statue on a grass patch.

Early history 
Before the arrival of Europeans, Cockatoo Island was used by the indigenous Australian people of Sydney's coastal region. In 1839 it was chosen as the site of a new penal establishment by the Governor of the colony of New South Wales, Sir George Gipps. Between 1839 and 1869 the island was used as a convict prison. Initially, prisoners were transferred to Cockatoo Island from Norfolk Island, and were employed constructing their barracks and rock-cut silos for storing the colony's grain supply.

Later, quarrying on the island provided stone for construction projects around Sydney, including the seawall for Circular Quay. Between 1847 and 1857, convicts were used to dig the Fitzroy Dock, Australia's first dry dock, on the island. An estimated  of rock was excavated with  forming the dock itself.

In 2009, an archeological dig on the island uncovered convict era punishment cells under the cookhouse. These cells give a valuable insight into the conditions convicts lived under on the island.

One prisoner on Cockatoo Island was the Australian bushranger, Captain Thunderbolt, who escaped in 1863 to begin the crime spree which made him famous. It is alleged that his wife had swum across to the island with tools to effect his escape, following which they both swam back to the mainland. There is no significant evidence to support this claim.

From 1871 to 1913 facilities on the island often referred to the name Biloela instead of Cockatoo Island to avoid the stigma of the island's convict past.

Fitzroy Graving Dock 

The dock was designed by Gother Kerr Mann, the island's Civil Engineer, and built between 1847 and 1857 utilising convict labour. The foundation stone of its ashlar lining was laid on 5 June 1854 by Governor Charles Augustus FitzRoy, with the dock being named in his honour.

Number 1 (Sutherland) Dock 

The dock was constructed under the supervision of the engineer Louis Samuel between 1882 and 1890. The dock was modified in 1913 and in 1927 to accommodate Royal Australian Navy ships.

Industrial School, Reformatory and Gaol 
In 1864, the island was split between the NSW Department of Prisons and the Public Works Department, which expanded the dockyard around the foreshores. In 1869, the convicts were relocated to Darlinghurst Gaol and the prison complex became an Industrial School for Girls and also a Reformatory.

Cockatoo Island Dockyard 

Shipbuilding began on Cockatoo Island in 1870. In 1913, Cockatoo Island was transferred to the Commonwealth Government to become the Naval Dockyard of the Royal Australian Navy. Over a period of several years prior to World War I, five slipways were either upgraded or constructed in the island, with Numbers 1 and 2 still retained by the Sydney Harbour Federation Trust.

The torpedo boat destroyer  was the first naval ship launched at Cockatoo Island, after being built in the United Kingdom, disassembled, then sent to the Australian shipyard for reassembly. During World War I, the dockyard built, repaired and refitted many ships. At its peak during the war, some 4,000 men were employed on the island.

In 1933, Cockatoo Island was leased to the Cockatoo Docks & Engineering Company for 21 years. The lease was renewed in 1954 for a further 20 years and again in 1972 for 21 years.

In 1995, community action played an important role in the preservation of the place. A group 'Friends of Cockatoo Island' was founded by Jack Clark and his wife Mary Shelley Clark, to fight for the preservation of the Island and other former Defence sites around Sydney Harbour. Their and other group's campaigns resulted in the Federal Government's decision to establish the Sydney Harbour Federation Trust which aimed to protect many Harbour sites including the Cockatoo Island.

Heritage listings 
In July 2010, at the 34th session of the UNESCO World Heritage Committee, Cockatoo Island and ten other Australian sites with a significant association with convict transportation were inscribed as a group on the World Heritage List as the Australian Convict Sites. The listing explains that the eleven sites present "the best surviving examples of large-scale convict transportation and the colonial expansion of European powers through the presence and labour of convicts". Of the eleven sites, as well as Cockatoo Island, the Hyde Park Barracks, Old Great North Road, and Old Government House at Parramatta are also within the Sydney region.

Parts of Cockatoo Island are the subject of other heritage listings. Listed on the Commonwealth Heritage List are:

Cockatoo Island Industrial Conservation Area
Prison Barracks Precinct
Convict Barracks Block
Military Guard Room
Mess Hall
Underground Grain Silos
Biloela House precinct
Fitzroy Dock
Sutherland Dock
 Power House & Pump House

Cockatoo Island events 
Since 2005, Cockatoo Island has hosted a number of major events. They range from collaborations with the Sydney Writers' Festival to an international freestyle motocross competition. A summary is provided in the following table:

Planning and projects 
Stewardship of Cockatoo Island was handed to the Sydney Harbour Federation Trust in 2001 to plan a new chapter for the island as publicly owned urban park. In 2003 the Harbour Trust completed a comprehensive plan for Cockatoo Island and other sites around Sydney Harbour managed by the Trust. The initial plan, approved by the Minister in 2003, proposed the revitalisation of Cockatoo Island as a landmark harbour attraction with the revival of maritime activities, the interpretation of its rich colonial and industrial heritage, and the creation of parklands and spaces for cultural events. In 2010, the Harbour Trust produced a revised management plan for the island.

Urban Islands 
In 2009 the Urban Islands masterclass was taught "by 3 groups of international emerging architects on and about the controversial site of Cockatoo Island":

Cross disciplinary creativity, experimental tactics and broad based participation are needed to inject Cockatoo Island with renewed life. The proposals developed in the 12-days play an active role in generating tangible proposals for Cockatoo Island, producing outcomes such as large-scale installations, futurologist proposals, media activism experiments, and greater harbour master planning visions.

One of the masterclass leaders was Geoff Manaugh, author of the influential BLDGBLOG. A second masterclass was planned for 2011.

Transport 
When a working dockyard, Sydney Ferries Limited and its successors operated services from Circular Quay to the island at shift changeover times.

In April 2007, the wharf reopened for a three-month trial coinciding with the reopening of the island as a tourist attraction. Since then services have expanded, and today it is served by Sydney Ferries Parramatta River services operating between Circular Quay and Parramatta. It is also the terminus for all stops Cockatoo Island ferry services from Circular Quay. The single wharf is served by First Fleet and RiverCat class ferries.

References

External links 

Cockatoo Island website
Sydney Harbour Federation Trust Sites – Cockatoo Island
Vintage aerial photograph by Frank Hurley at the National Library of Australia
UNESCO announcement of World Heritage listing
 

 
Australian Convict Sites
Australian penal colonies
Defunct prisons in Sydney
Islands of New South Wales
Museums in Sydney
Prison museums in Australia
Sydney localities
Tourist attractions in Sydney
Convictism in New South Wales
Islands of Sydney
World Heritage Sites in New South Wales
Inner West Council